Anatoly Khrupov was a Soviet photographer. His photographs were published in Soviet Life.

References

Soviet photographers